The Wales women's national Rugby League team represents Wales in Women's Rugby League. They are administered by the Wales Rugby League. The first match played by the team was a 'friendly' against Great Britain Teachers in 2019. Another friendly match, against England Lions was played in November 2019. The first full international played by the team was in June 2021.

Players
The following players were named in the squads to play  on 8 October 2022. Tallies in the table include this match.

Results

Full internationals 

Upcoming Fixtures:
 During 2023 and 2024 Wales are drawn to play the following three teams in Group A of the European Qualifiers for the 2025 Women's Rugby League  World Cup. Dates and hosts have been selected but the venues are yet to be announced.
  on 30 Sep 2023 in Wales.
  on 28 Oct 2023 in Greece.
  on 11 May 2024 in Türkiye.

Other matches

References

External links
 Wales Rugby League

Women's national rugby league teams
Wales national rugby league team
Year of establishment missing
Women in Wales